Smit Kamleshbhai Patel  (born 16 May 1993) is a former Indian cricketer. Patel plays as a wicketkeeper, represented the India Under-19 cricket team World Cup winning squad in 2012, and has also played for the Gujarat cricket team.

He scored unbeaten 62 runs and helped to secured in India's to Under-19s World Cup glory at Tony Ireland Stadium. Patel and Unmukt Chand shared an unbroken 130-run stand for the fifth wicket after India had slipped from 75 for 1 to 97 for 4.

In December 2012, Patel made his first first-class century in only his fifth game to lead a strong Gujarat batting performance against Hyderabad at Sardar Vallabhbhai Patel Stadium in Valsad. He was the leading run-scorer for Tripura in the 2017–18 Ranji Trophy, with 526 runs in six matches.

In May 2021, Patel retired from all cricket under the remit of the Board of Control for Cricket in India (BCCI) to be eligible to play cricket in the United States. In June 2021, he was selected to take part in the Minor League Cricket tournament in the United States following the players' draft.

References

External links
 

Living people
1993 births
Indian cricketers
Gujarat cricketers
India Red cricketers
Cricketers from Ahmedabad
Gujarati people
Tripura cricketers
Wicket-keepers